is a junction railway station in Taihaku-ku, Sendai, Miyagi Prefecture, Japan, operated by East Japan Railway Company (JR East) and the Sendai Subway.

Lines
Nagamachi Station is served by the Sendai Subway Nanboku Line, and on JR East's Joban Line and Tohoku Main Line. The Sendai Airport Access Line uses the same tracks, but passes through the station without stopping. The subway and JR lines are not directly connected; however, the distance between the two stations is only around two hundred metres.

Station layout
JR Nagamachi Station is an elevated station with one island platform, and the station building located underneath. The station has a "Midori no Madoguchi" staffed ticket office. The Sendai Subway portion of the station has a single underground island platform.

JR East platforms

Sendai Subway platforms

History
Nagamachi Station opened on November 2, 1894, as a military station of Nippon Railway. It was opened to the general public on February 21, 1896. The station was absorbed into the JR East network upon the privatization of the Japanese National Railways (JNR) on April 1, 1987. The subway station opened on June 15, 1987.

Passenger statistics
In fiscal 2018, the JR East station was used by an average of 9,513 passengers daily (boarding passengers only). In the same year, the Sendai Subway station was used by an average of 8,477 passengers daily.

Surrounding area
 
 
Sendai-Taihaku Ward Office
Sendai-Nitta Post Office

References

External links

 JR East Station information 
 Sendai Subway Station information 

Stations of East Japan Railway Company
Railway stations in Sendai
Sendai Subway Namboku Line
Tōhoku Main Line
Jōban Line
Railway stations in Japan opened in 1894